Lee Young-hee (born 1965) is a South Korean correctional bureaucrat served as the 8th Commissioner of the Korea Correctional Service - the first woman to lead KCS since its creation in 1948 - from 2020 to 2021.

After studying law and passing the state exam, Lee dedicated her career in public service - at KCS and its parent organisation, Ministry of Justice, in particular - for over thirty years. Before promoted to the head of KCS, Lee was leading the Department of Correctional Training at Institute of Justice, the research institute of Ministry of Justice. Previously, she led Ministry's Social Reintegration Division as well as KCS' Gimcheon Juvenile Prison, Hwaseong Vocational Training Prison, Gwangju Correctional Institution and Suwon Detention Center.

Lee holds two degrees - LLB from Wonkwang University and Master of Public Administration from Korea University.

References 

South Korean government officials
Korea University alumni
1965 births
Living people